Cionidae is a family of sea squirts belonging to the suborder Phlebobranchia.

References 

Enterogona
Tunicate families